Mirani is an electoral district of the Legislative Assembly in the Australian state of Queensland. It is represented by Stephen Andrew, of Pauline Hanson's One Nation.

It covers much of the Queensland coast between the cities of Rockhampton and Mackay, as well as the hinterland west of Mackay. Towns include St Lawrence, Carmila, Sarina and Eungella. The district is named after the town of Mirani.

Mirani was historically a safely conservative seat, and was held by the Country Party and its successors the National Party and Liberal National Party from 1947 to 2015. A redistribution in 2008 made Mirani a notionally Labor held seat with a 1.2% margin, but veteran incumbent Ted Malone achieved a swing strong enough to retain this seat at the 2009 election. Malone retired at the 2015 state election, at which Jim Pearce, formerly Labor member for abolished Fitzroy from 1989 to 2009, became only the second Labor member ever to win Mirani.

Pearce was subsequently defeated at the 2017 election by Stephen Andrew, of Pauline Hanson's One Nation.

Members for Mirani

Election results

References

External links
 

Mirani